All Saints' Anglican Church or All Saints Anglican Church may refer to the following Anglican churches:

Australia 
 All Saints Anglican Church, Brisbane
 All Saints' Anglican Church, Condobolin
 All Saints Anglican Church, Darnley Island
 All Saints Anglican Church, Henley Brook
 All Saints Anglican Church, Petersham
 All Saints Anglican Church, Yandilla

Canada 
 All Saints Anglican Church (Dominion City, Manitoba)
 All Saints Anglican Church (Ottawa)

United Kingdom 
 All Saints' Church, Petersham, London